The United States Capitol Visitor Center commemorative coins are a series of commemorative coins which were issued by the United States Mint in 2001.

Legislation
The United States Capitol Visitor Center Commemorative Coins Act authorized the production of three coins, a clad half dollar, a silver dollar, and a gold half eagle. The act allowed the coins to be struck in both proof and uncirculated finishes. The coins were released on February 28, 2001.

Designs

Half Dollar

The obverse of the U.S. Capitol Visitor Center half dollar, designed by Dean McMullen, features the North Wing of the original Capitol superimposed on an outline of the present building with a horse drawn carriage in the foreground. The image is surrounded by a ring of 50 stars representing the 50 states of the Union. The reverse of the coin, designed by Alex Shagin and Marcel Jovine, features 16 stars - representing the 16 states that existed in 1800 - around the center, with inscriptions recognizing the 32 Senators and 106 House members of the 6th Congress.

Dollar

The obverse of the U.S. Capitol Visitor Center dollar, designed by Marika Somogyi, features an image of the original Capitol in the foreground and the present building in the background. 
The reverse of the coin, designed by John Mercanti, features a contemporary interpretation of the U.S. bald eagle wrapped in a banner that says "U.S. Capitol Visitor Center".

Half eagle

The obverse of the U.S  Capitol Visitor Center half eagle, designed by Elizabeth Jones, depicts the top of a Corinthian column and the words "First Convening of Congress in Washington". The reverse of the coin, also designed by Jones, shows the Capitol building as it appeared in 1800.

Specifications
Half Dollar
 Display Box Color: Dark Blue 
 Edge: Reeded
 Weight: 11.340 grams
 Diameter: 30.61 millimeters; 1.205 inches
 Composition: 92% copper; 8% nickel (Cupronickel)

Dollar
 Display Box Color: Dark Blue
 Edge: Reeded
 Weight: 26.730 grams; 0.8594 troy ounce
 Diameter: 38.10 millimeters; 1.50 inches
 Composition: 90% Silver, 10% Copper

Half Eagle
 Display Box Color: Dark Blue
 Edge: Reeded
 Weight: 8.359 grams; 0.2687 troy ounce
 Diameter: 21.59 millimeters; 0.850 inch
 Composition: 90% Gold, 3.6% Silver, 6.4% Copper

See also

 United States commemorative coins
 List of United States commemorative coins and medals (2000s)

References

Modern United States commemorative coins
United States Capitol
2001 establishments in Washington, D.C.